Leszczka is a river of Poland, a tributary of the Nurzec southeast of Brańsk.

Rivers of Poland
Rivers of Podlaskie Voivodeship